Art Staed (born 1949) is a current Iowa State Representative from the 66th District.  A Democrat, he was in the Iowa House of Representatives for one term, from 2007 to 2009. Staed holds a B.A. in Philosophy from Rockhurst University in Kansas City, a Master's degree in Secondary Education from the University of Missouri at Kansas City and another master's degree in Secondary Administration from East Central University in Ada, Oklahoma.

Staed served on several committees in the Iowa House – Education, Labor, and Veterans Affairs.  He also served as vice chair of the Economic Growth Committee and of the Economic Development Appropriations Subcommittee.

As of the 2013 Legislative Session, Staed is serving on the Education, Local Government and Veterans Affairs committees and the Administration and Regulation Appropriations Subcommittee.

Electoral history
Staed ran for the Iowa House in 2004, losing to the incumbent, Republican Jeff Elgin.  He was elected in 2006, defeating Republican opponent Andy Anderson.  Republican Renee Schulte narrowly defeated him in 2008, 8628 (49.95%)
to 8615 (49.88%). A recount resulted in a net gain of one vote for Staed, leaving the election with a 13-vote margin of victory.

References

External links

 Staed on Project Vote Smart
 Staed's Capitol Web Address
 Staed's campaign website
 Iowa House Democrats – Member profile: Rep. Art Staed

1949 births
Living people
Politicians from Joplin, Missouri
Democratic Party members of the Iowa House of Representatives
Politicians from Cedar Rapids, Iowa
Rockhurst University alumni
University of Missouri–Kansas City alumni
East Central University alumni
Educators from Iowa
21st-century American politicians
Educators from Missouri